Northern Plains National Heritage Area is a federally designated National Heritage Area along an  length of the Missouri River in central North Dakota. The heritage area promotes and interprets the scenic, cultural and historic heritage of the region. It extends from Knife River Indian Villages National Historic Site to Huff Indian Village State Historic Site The area interprets the history of the Three Affiliated Tribes, the passage of the Lewis and Clark Expedition, the fur trade, steamboats on the Missouri and Fort Abraham Lincoln.  It also  interprets the area's association with the Northern Pacific Railroad, as well as the area's heritage in agriculture and energy production.

The Northern Plains National Heritage Area comprises portions of Burleigh, Morton, Mercer, McLean and Oliver counties.

Northern Plains National Heritage Area was established by the Omnibus Public Land Management Act of 2009.

References

External links
 Northern Plans National Heritage Area official site

 
National Heritage Areas of the United States
Protected areas of Burleigh County, North Dakota
Protected areas of Morton County, North Dakota
Protected areas of Mercer County, North Dakota
Protected areas of McLean County, North Dakota
Protected areas of Oliver County, North Dakota
Protected areas established in 2009
2009 establishments in North Dakota